Haider Ali Shah (born 5 May 1963) is a Pakistani athlete. He competed in the men's triple jump at the 1988 Summer Olympics.

References

1963 births
Living people
Athletes (track and field) at the 1988 Summer Olympics
Pakistani male triple jumpers
Olympic athletes of Pakistan
Place of birth missing (living people)